The Secaș (also: Secașul Mic) is a left tributary of the river Târnava in Romania. It discharges into the Târnava in Obreja.

Tributaries
The following rivers are tributaries to the river Secaș (from source to mouth):

Left: Lunca Satului, Valea Pustie, Trecătoarea, Valea Hăncii, Păuca, Gârdan, Ungurei, Valea lui Sânui, Bolânda, Ohaba, Gârbău, Valea Seacă, Henig, Valea Largă

References

Rivers of Romania
Rivers of Alba County
Rivers of Sibiu County